The Monastery of St Lot is a Byzantine-period monastic site near the Dead Sea in Jordan, at the entrance to a natural cave, which Christians believed to have been the one where Lot and his daughters sought shelter after Sodom was destroyed. The monastery, dating to the 5th-7th centuries, is centered around a basilical church and overlooks from a steep slope the southeastern Dead Sea and the modern town of Safi in Jordan.

History and archaeology
Archaeological finds reveal a long-term settlement regime for the cave the sanctuary is built around. The oldest material found inside the cave suggests a sizable Early and Middle Bronze Age presence, followed by Nabataean pottery, which is indicative of a settlement there during the first centuries BCE and CE.

However, the bulk of the findings are associated with the church and monastery and date to the early Byzantine period (c. 5th-7th centuries). Two inscriptions on the church's mosaic floor bear dates from the 7th century. Habitation only ceased after the Early Abbasid period (late 8th to early 9th centuries), which is interpreted to show that both Christians and Muslims still venerated St Lot at the site throughout this time.

World Heritage status
This site was added to the UNESCO World Heritage Tentative List on June 18, 2001 in the Cultural category.

References

Bibliography

The Sanctuary of Agios Lot, At Deir 'Ain 'Abata - UNESCO World Heritage Centre Accessed 2009-02-27.
 (Snippet view).

External Links
Photos of Deir Ain Abata at the American Center of Research
Photos of Deir Ain Abata at the Manar al-Athar photo archive

Archaeological sites in Jordan
Lot (biblical person)